The Tahamí (TT) or Tahamí-Panzenú Terrane is one of the geological provinces (terranes) of Colombia. The terrane, dating to the Permo-Triassic, is situated on the North Andes Plate. The contact with the Chibcha, Arquía and Quebradagrande Terranes is formed by the megaregional Romeral Fault System. A tiny terrane is located at the contact with the Quebradagrande Terrane; Anacona Terrane.

The terrane is offset along the regional Bucaramanga-Santa Marta Fault from the Caribbean, La Guajira and Chibcha Terranes, and by the regional Oca Fault with the Chibcha Terrane.

Etymology 

The terrane is, as the Chibcha Terrane, named after an indigenous people from Antioquia; the Chibcha-speaking , part of the greater Nutabe group. Panzenú refers to the Zenú civilization, that thrived from about 200 BCE to 1600 CE in the Sinú river basin.

Reinterpretation 
A study performed by Mora Bohórquez et al. in 2017 showed no basement variation between the Chibcha Terrane San Lucas basement underlying the Lower Magdalena Valley (VIM) and the SNSM basement to the east of the Santa Marta Fault. The authors redefined the contacts between the different terranes, using the names Calima Terrane for the coastal portion of the Caribbean Terrane (San Jacinto and Sinú foldbelts) and Tahamí-Panzenú Terrane for the Tahamí Terrane.

Subdivision

Complexes 
 Antioquia Batholith
 Romeral
 Hispania
 Pueblito
 Montegrande
 Palmitas
 Ayura Montebello
 Medellín Dunite
 Ceja
 Medellín Amphibolite
 San Isidro
 Cambumbia
 Úrsula
 Amagá
 La Honda
 Alto de Minas
 Norosí
 Jonjoncito

Volcanoes 

 Nevado del Ruiz
 Nevado del Tolima
 Doña Juana
 Galeras

Ranges 
 Central
 Macuira
 SNSM

Basins 
 Amagá
 Cocinetas
 Lower Magdalena (VIM)

Faults 
bounding faults in bold

 Bucaramanga-Santa Marta (BSF)
 Romeral (RFS)
 Armenia
 Buesaco-Aranda
 Córdoba-Navarco
 Montenegro
 Paraíso
 Piendamó
 Rosas-Julumito
 Bagre Norte
 Cimitarra
 Cucuana
 Mulato-Getudo
 Otú Norte
 Palestina
 Espiritú Santo
 Uramita

Gallery

See also 

 List of earthquakes in Colombia
 List of fossiliferous stratigraphic units in Colombia
 List of mining areas in Colombia
 Geology of the Eastern Hills of Bogotá
 Cesar-Ranchería Basin
 Cocinetas Basin
 Middle Magdalena Valley (VMM)

References

Bibliography

Terranes

Tahamí Terrane

Reports

Maps 
 
 
 
 
 

Terranes
Geology of Colombia
Permian Colombia
Triassic Colombia
Terranes
Terranes
Terranes
Terranes
Terranes
Terranes
Terranes
Terranes
Terranes
Terranes
Terranes
Terranes
Geology of the Andes
Chibchan languages